Bathymodiolus childressi is a species of deepwater mussel, a marine bivalve mollusk species in the family Mytilidae, the mussels.

Although this species has been known since 1985, it was formally described as a species in 1998.

Habitat
This species lives in cold seeps in the Gulf of Mexico.

Bathymodiolus childressi is stenothermal species living in temperatures ranging from 6.5 to 7.2 °C. However it was able to survive the temperature of 20 °C in the laboratory.

Symbiosis
This mussel harbors intracellular methanotrophic bacteria in its gills. The bacteria provide carbon to the mussel.

Interspecific relationships 
The snail Bathynerita naticoidea can detect beds of the mussel Bathymodiolus childressi. It is attracted to water that has been altered by this species of mussel, but the nature of the attractant was not discovered yet. This snail also feeds on periphyton of methanotrophic bacteria that grow on the shells of Bathymodiolus childressi, living on the decomposing periostracum of the mussels and on byssal fibres of those mussels.

Etymology
This species was named after James J. Childress, a marine biologist who investigated the physiology of this mussel at the University of California, Santa Barbara.

References

External links

childressi
Molluscs described in 1998
Molluscs of the Atlantic Ocean